Brian O'Keefe (born 10 December 1956) is  a former Australian rules footballer who played with Footscray in the Victorian Football League (VFL).

Notes

External links 
		

Living people
1956 births
Australian rules footballers from Victoria (Australia)
Western Bulldogs players